The 2019–20 Andebol 1 (known as the Campeonato Placard Andebol 1) was the 68th season of the Portuguese premier handball league. It rams from 28 August 2019 to 16 May 2020. FC Porto qualified for the 2020–21 EHF Champions League for being in 1st place of the Andebol 1 classification table at the time of the cancellation, but was not declared champion.

Teams

The following 14 clubs compete in the Andebol 1 during the 2019–20 season:

League table

Canceled the Second Round 

On April 29, 2020, due to the coronavirus (COVID-19), the handball, basketball, roller hockey, and volleyball championships were eliminated by the respective federations, that is, the second phase of the championship was not held. However, those who qualified for European competitions were Porto and Sporting CP for the 2020–21 EHF Champions League Group Stage, Benfica for the 2020–21 EHF European League, and Belenenses for the 2020–21 EHF European Cup.

Top Three goalscorers

Notes

References

External links
Portuguese Handball Federaration 

Andebol 1
Portugal
Handball